The cabrette (French: literally "little goat", alternately musette) is a type of bagpipe which appeared in Auvergne, France in the 19th century, and rapidly spread to Haute-Auvergne and Aubrac.

Details 
The cabrette comprises a chanter for playing the melody and a drone, but the latter is not necessarily functional. Though descended from earlier mouth-blown bagpipes, bellows were added to the cabrette in the mid-19th century.  It is said that  Joseph Faure, of Saint-Martin-de-Fugères en Haute-Loire, first applied a bellows to the cabrette.  Faure, a carpenter stricken with lung disease, was inspired when he used a bellows to start a fire.

See also
Chabrette, a similarly named bagpipe used in the Limousin region of central France

Sources 
Dedicated cabrette site

External links

Bagpipes
French musical instruments